Benthofascis is a genus of sea snails, marine gastropod mollusks in the family Conorbidae.

Like other species in the superfamily Conoidea these snails are predatory and venomous, able to inject neurotoxins into their prey with their radula.

This genus was previously included in the family Turridae (subfamily Conorbinae)  and later in the family Conidae. In 2009 Tucker & Tenorio included it in the family Conorbidae.

Species
The known living species within the genus Benthofascis are:
 Benthofascis angularis Tucker, Tenorio & Stahlschmidt, 2011
 † Benthofascis atractoides (Tate, 1890) 
 Benthofascis biconica (Hedley, 1903)
 Benthofascis conorbioides Tucker, Tenorio & Stahlschmidt, 2011
 Benthofascis lozoueti Sysoev & Bouchet, 2001
 † Benthofascis otwayensis Long, 1981 – from Oligocene of Victoria, Australia
 Benthofascis pseudobiconica Tucker, Tenorio & Stahlschmidt, 2011
 Benthofascis sarcinula (Hedley, 1905)

References

Further reading
 Sysoev, A. & Bouchet, P. 2001. New and uncommon turriform gastropods (Gastropoda: Conoidea) from the South-West Pacific. Mémoires du Muséum National d'Histoire Naturelle. Paris 185: 271–320

External links
 Image of Benthofascis biconica (Hedley, 1903) at Gastropods.com
 Iredale, T. (1936). Australian molluscan notes, no. 2. Records of the Australian Museum. 19(5): 267-340, pls 20-24

 
Gastropod genera